George II of Hesse-Darmstadt,  (17 March 1605, in Darmstadt – 11 June 1661) was the Landgrave of Hesse-Darmstadt from 1626 to 1661. He was the son of Ludwig V and Magdalene of Brandenburg.

He married Sophia Eleonore of Saxony on 1 April 1627.  From 1645 to 1648 he led the so-called Hessenkrieg against the Landgravine Amalie Elizabeth of Hesse-Kassel over the inheritance of the extinct line of Hesse-Marburg.  This conflict resulted in the loss of Hesse-Marburg to Hesse-Kassel.

Children
Louis VI (1630–1678)
Magdalena Sybilla (1631–1651)
George (1632–1676), married Dorothea Augusta, Duchess of Holstein-Sonderborg
Sophia Eleonore (1634–1663), married Landgrave William Christoph of Hesse-Homburg
Elisabeth Amalie (1635–1709), married Philip William, Elector Palatine
Louise Christine (1636–1697)
Anna Maria (1637-1637)
Anna Sophia II, Princess-Abbess of Quedlinburg (1638-1683)
Amalia Juliana (1639-1639)
Stillborn daughter (1640)
Henrica Dorothea (1641–1672), married Count John II of Waldeck-Landau
John (1642–1643)
Augusta Philippina (1643–1672)
Agnes (1645-1645)
Marie Hedwig (1647–1680), married Duke Bernhard I of Saxe-Meiningen

Ancestry

References
Georg II. , Landgraf von Hessen-Darmstadt (Biography in German)
Wikisource: Allgemeine Deutsch Biographie "Georg II. (Landgraf von Hesse-Darmstadt)" (in German)

|-

1605 births
1661 deaths
Landgraves of Hesse-Darmstadt
Nobility from Darmstadt